Montford McGehee (December 4, 1822 – March 31, 1895) was a North Carolina politician and farmer who served in the North Carolina General Assembly, and as the second North Carolina Commissioner of Agriculture.

Education
McGehee graduated with his bachelor's degrees from the University of North Carolina in 1841, where in 1844, he also received his Master of Arts degree. From 1841 to 1842 McGehee studied law at Harvard Law School.  After he left Harvard, McGehee furthered his legal education by reading for the law under the tutelage of North Carolina Judge W.H. Battle, and was admitted to the North Carolina Bar in 1844.

Family life

Marriage
On September 25, 1854 McGehee married Sally Polk Badger, daughter of  U.S. Senator George Edmund Badger, at Christ Church Raleigh, North Carolina.

Children
McGehee had a son Lucius Polk McGehee who was also a lawyer.

Death
McGehee died on March 31, 1895 at age seventy-three years at his home in Raleigh, North Carolina after a long illness.

End Notes

External links
Montford McGehee Papers, 1827–1890.

North Carolina Commissioners of Agriculture
1822 births
1895 deaths
North Carolina lawyers
North Carolina Whigs
19th-century American politicians
North Carolina Democrats
Members of the North Carolina House of Representatives
People from Person County, North Carolina
Burials at Historic Oakwood Cemetery
Harvard Law School alumni
University of North Carolina at Chapel Hill alumni